Centre hospitalier de l'Université Laval merged in December 1995 with two other teaching hospitals to form Centre hospitalier universitaire de Québec:
Hôtel-Dieu de Québec
Hôpital Saint-François d'Assise

External links
Official site

1951 establishments in Quebec
Hospitals established in 1951
Hospitals in Quebec City
Teaching hospitals in Canada